Waynne Phillips (born 15 December 1970 in Caernarfon, Wales) is a Welsh former professional footballer who played as a midfielder for various teams in the Football League.

Phillips, a fluent Welsh speaker from Caernarfon, joined Wrexham as a YTS apprentice in 1988 making his debut for the first team when replacing Joey Jones in a Welsh Cup match against Rhyl in 1990.

BBC Radio Cymru
Phillips occasionally works as a football commentator for BBC Radio Cymru.

References

External links

1970 births
Living people
People from Caernarfon
Sportspeople from Gwynedd
Welsh footballers
Association football midfielders
Wrexham A.F.C. players
Stockport County F.C. players
Caernarfon Town F.C. players
Cefn Druids A.F.C. players
English Football League players